The Jacks may refer to:
 Irish slang for the toilet
 Australian slang for the police
 A clipped version of Jackeen
 The Jacks (band), an American rock band from Los Angeles, California
 The Jacks (1960s Japanese band), a 1960s Japanese psychedelic rock group
 The Jacks, aka The Cadets (doo wop), a 1940s/1950s American group who have officially released work under the name "The Jacks" on RPM Records
 The Jacks, a Melbourne Australia based punk rock'n'roll trio 
 Swansea City, a Welsh football club and their supporters are unofficially nicknamed the Jacks